Hean Tat Keh is a professor and chair of the Department of Marketing at the Monash University Faculty of Business and Economics. He is known for his work on services marketing, consumer behavior, brand management, and marketing strategy. In particular, his research on services marketing addresses the limitations of the concepts of service inseparability and service intangibility. Keh has also published on the antecedents and consequences of brand equity. More recently, he has conducted research on sustainable marketing and healthcare marketing. His works have been cited over 9000 times according to Google Scholar.

Education and career
Keh received his PhD in marketing from the University of Washington, his MBA from the Hong Kong University of Science and Technology, and his BBA (Honours) from the University of Macau.

Keh is currently a full professor and chair of the Department of Marketing at the Monash University Faculty of Business and Economics, the first Asian-Australian to be appointed to this role. Before this, he taught at the UQ Business School, the University of Queensland, the Guanghua School of Management, Peking University, and the NUS Business School. Earlier in his career, he gained corporate experience at The Wharf (Holdings), Hong Kong.

He is currently also an associate editor of the Journal of Business Research and a member of the editorial board of the Australasian Marketing Journal. Keh is an academic advisory board member of the CMO Council.

Major awards
ANZMAC Distinguished Marketing Researcher award 2019
ANZMAC Distinguished Marketing Educator award 2018

Selected publications

Journal articles

Keh has published over 50 journal articles. Based on the Financial Times list of Top 50 journals, Keh has published the following articles:

Books

References

External links

Living people
Year of birth missing (living people)
Marketing theorists
Academic staff of Monash University
University of Washington Foster School of Business alumni
Alumni of the Hong Kong University of Science and Technology
University of Macau alumni